Sea of Fertility can refer to:

 Mare Fecunditatis ("Sea of Fertility"), a region of the Moon
 The Sea of Fertility, a series of four novels by Japanese writer Yukio Mishima